Duzan (also Romanized as Dūzān, Douzān and In the local language: Dehzin) is a village in Borborud-e Sharqi Rural District, in the Borborud sharqi District of Aligudarz County, Lorestan Province, Iran.

population 
At the 2015 census, its population was 1031, in 312 families.

References 

Towns and villages in Aligudarz County